Kentucky Route 1284, also known as Sunrise-Richland Road and Sunrise-Claysville Road, acts as a cutoff between US-27 and US-62 north of Cynthiana.  It is a completely rural route through rolling farmland and has no major junctions.

Route description
KY 1284 begins at an intersection with US 27 north of Cynthiana in Harrison County, heading east on two-lane undivided Sunrise-Richland Road. The road passes through a mix of farmland and woodland with some homes. The route turns south onto Sunrise-Claysville Road and passes through more rural areas, curving east. KY 1284 winds southeast and reaches its eastern terminus at US 62.

Major intersections

References

1284
Transportation in Harrison County, Kentucky